The following is a list of current and former professional sports teams in Illinois.

Current professional sports teams

Former professional sports teams

See also
List of developmental and minor sports leagues
Professional sports leagues in the United States
Sports in the United States

Illinois

Professional sports teams